Hocking may refer to:

Places
 Hocking County, Ohio, United States
 Hocking Township, Fairfield County, Ohio
 Hocking Hills, Ohio
 Hocking River, Ohio
 Hocking Canal, a former canal that ran parallel to the Hocking River
 Hocking, Western Australia, a suburb of Perth, Western Australia, located within the City of Wanneroo

People
 Hocking (surname)
 Hocking H. Hunter (1801–1872), American politician

Other uses
 Hocking College, Ohio
 Hocking Correctional Facility, Hocking County, Ohio
 , a World War II attack transport

See also
 Hocking House, Maryland, United States, on the National Register of Historic Places